Valdis Pultraks (1922–1972) was a Latvian football goalkeeper, one of the most known Latvian footballers of the early post-World War II era.

At the age of just 14 Pultraks already played for FK Ausma from Auce in the Latvian Cup quarterfinals. Until the mid-1940s in addition to football Pultraks actively participated in athletics events - even in 1947 when he already played for FK Dinamo Rīga he won the bronze medal at the Latvian athletics championship in 100 meter run. His first professional football team was Daugava Liepāja in 1946 from which he moved to Dinamo Rīga and when Dinamo was merged with Daugava Rīga - Pultraks became goalkeeper with the best football club in Latvia. In the Soviet elite league Pultraks had a strong competition for the number one goalkeeper position in Daugava, but he succeeded at that, however when in 1952 Daugava was relegated from the top league, Pultraks left the club.

Pultraks later played with Sarkanais metalurgs Liepāja and he also played for Daugava in its first serious international match against IK Sture from Stockholm.

Valdis Pultraks died at the age of 50.

1922 births
1972 deaths
Latvian footballers
Daugava Rīga players
Association football goalkeepers
Soviet footballers